Jaime Amat (1 September 1941 – 18 February 2020) was a Spanish field hockey player. He competed at the 1964 and the 1972 Summer Olympics.

References

External links
 

1941 births
2020 deaths
Spanish male field hockey players
Olympic field hockey players of Spain
Field hockey players at the 1964 Summer Olympics
Field hockey players at the 1972 Summer Olympics
Field hockey players from Barcelona